Paolo Calcinaro (born 13 September 1977 in Fermo) is an Italian politician. An independent member of a centrist local Civic List, he was deputy mayor of the city of Fermo from 2011 to 2013. Calcinaro was elected Mayor of Fermo on 17 June 2015.

He was re-elected for a second term on 22 September 2020.

See also
2015 Italian local elections
2020 Italian local elections
List of mayors of Fermo

References

External links
 
 

1977 births
Living people
Mayors of places in Marche
People from Fermo